Dwayne Stephens is an American basketball coach who is currently the men's head coach for the Western Michigan Broncos. Previously, he was an assistant and associate head coach at Michigan State for 19 years.

Playing career
Stephens played basketball at Michigan State from 1989 to 1993 under Spartan legend Jud Heathcote. He was a four-year letter winner for the Spartans and was a third-team Basketball Weekly's Freshman All-America Team. In his junior year, he averaged 11.2 points and five rebounds. In his senior season, he was co-captain for the Spartans and averaged 9.1 points and 5.6 rebounds per game. He was named to Basketball Weekly's Honorable Mention All-Midwest Team. He played three professional seasons in Europe.

Coaching career
Stephens began his coaching career as an assistant for two season at Oakland from 1997 to 1999. He then joined former Tom Izzo assistant Tom Crean at Marquette and went to the Final Four in 2003 with Marquette star Dwyane Wade. Stephens then joined his alma mater, Michigan State and its Hall of Fame head coach Tom Izzo, as an assistant in 2003. He was named associate head coach in 2012.

On April 4, 2022, Stephens, who had been considered for the position in 2020, accepted the head coaching position at Western Michigan.

Head coaching record

References

External links
Western Michigan profile

Living people
American men's basketball coaches
American men's basketball players
Michigan State Spartans men's basketball players
Michigan State Spartans men's basketball coaches
Western Michigan Broncos men's basketball coaches
Oakland Golden Grizzlies men's basketball coaches
Marquette Golden Eagles men's basketball
Year of birth missing (living people)